Moosehead may refer to:

Belfast and Moosehead Lake Railroad
Dartmouth Moosehead Dry
Halifax Mooseheads, a team in the Canadian hockey League that plays in Halifax, Nova Scotia, Canada
, the name of more than one United States Navy ship
Moosehead Brewery, Canada's oldest independently owned brewery located and based out of Saint John, New Brunswick
Moosehead Lake in Maine in the United States
Moosehead, Nova Scotia, a community in Nova Scotia, Canada
Mooseheads, Canberra, a bar in Canberra, Australia